The North Shore Honu were a minor league baseball team in the Hawaii Winter Baseball league. They were based in Waipahu, Hawaii. The name honu is the Hawaiian word for sea turtle. They played their home games at the Hans L'Orange Field.

Notable alumni
Ryan Kalish, Chicago Cubs outfielder
Kenley Jansen, Atlanta Braves relief pitcher

Team Record

References

2006 establishments in Hawaii
Baseball teams established in 2006
Defunct Hawaii Winter Baseball teams
2008 disestablishments in Hawaii
Baseball teams disestablished in 2008
Defunct baseball teams in Hawaii